Pakshadhara Mishra or Pakṣadhara Miśra ( Sanskrit: पक्षाधर मिश्रा  ) was an Indian Philosopher and a scholar of Nyaya Shastra. He was the head professor of Nyaya Shastra in the Ancient Mithila University during 15th century CE. His famous pupils are Vasudeva Sarvabhauma and Raghunatha Siromani.  His academy is known as Pakshadhara Mithila Academy or School.

References 

Indian philosophers
Indian philosophers by century
Nyaya
Mithila
Maithil Brahmin
Indian philosophy